() is a traditional Balinese and Osing dance drama performance originated from the Indonesian island of Bali, and commonly performed by Balinese in Bali as well as Osing people in the easternmost region of Java. The term roughly translates to '"infatuation," with a connotation of someone who is madly in love” :97

History 
Janger is a social dance created in the 1920s, though its exact date of origin is unknown:17, 161 I Madé Kredek claims it 'originated in the village of Menyali, North Bali and the songs featured in it were those of the horse drivers in the area.':101

Performance 
Janger is a 'flirtatious youth group dance';:92 it begins with a tableau vivant and a welcoming song.:161 This is followed by 12 male dancers (kecak) who perform an elaborate routine; when finished, they sit in two rows of six facing each other, and a female group (janger) enters and sings a traditional folk song,:161 and perform a slower dance with an 'emphasis on fluid, undulating, arm movements':100 When finished they form two lines of six, with the male dancers 'forming a boundary around the playing area.':161 This opening is followed by a drama, which usually concerns some sort of domestic theme.:162

Gallery

See also

Gandrung
Kecak

References

Balinese culture
Dances of Bali
Theatre in Indonesia
Traditional drama and theatre of Indonesia